The 2019 Iberia Cup was a Twenty20 International (T20I) cricket tournament held in Spain between 25 and 27 October 2019. The participating teams were the hosts Spain, along with Gibraltar and Portugal. The teams competed for the Iberian Cup, which was contested in the 1990s, and was last played in 2008 as a double match series between Spain and Gibraltar. Gibraltar and Portugal played their first matches with T20I status during the tournament, following the decision of the International Cricket Council (ICC) to grant full Twenty20 International status to all its members from 1 January 2019. Spain won the series with a 100% record.

Squads

Points table

Fixtures

References

External links
 Series home at ESPN Cricinfo

Associate international cricket competitions in 2019–20
Iberia Cup